Copped Hall, also known as Copt Hall or Copthall, is a mid-18th-century English country house close to Waltham Abbey, Essex, which has been undergoing restoration since 1999. Copped Hall is visible from the M25 motorway between junctions 26 and 27. There was a separate Copped Hall (or Coppeed Hall) in Totteridge, which was demolished in 1928.

History

Foundation
King richard I bestowed the lands on Richard Fitz Aucher to hold them in fee, and hereditarily of the Abbey. During the reign of Edward I Copthall continued in the possession of the Fitz Aucher family till it came into the hands of the Abbot until the Dissolution of the Monasteries by King Henry VIII.

Heyday

Sir Thomas Heneage received the estate of Copthall on 13 August 1564 from Queen Elizabeth I, where he subsequently built an elaborate mansion. The Queen was a frequent visitor to Essex and she is recorded as having visited Heneage at Copthall in 1575. His daughter, afterwards Countess of Winchelsea, sold it to the Earl of Middlesex in the reign of James I. From him it passed to Charles Sackville, Earl of Dorset, who sold it in 1701 to Sir Thomas Webster, Bt.

Edward Conyers purchased the estate in 1739, but he only owned the house for three years before dying in 1742. Conyers' son John (1717-1775) inherited the property and considered repairing the original Hall as it had become dilapidated. However, in the end he decided to build a new house on a different site. This was built between 1751 and 1758 after demolishing the old one around 1748.

The Georgian house, a large structure set in landscaped parkland, "has long been celebrated as one of the principal ornament of the country". The gardens of the main house have a ha-ha (a disguised ditch), which allows animals to approach yet prevents them from entering. It was a good example of the '18th-century house in landscape'. The mansion was placed overlooking two valleys with a third valley to the north. The building was well proportioned, with the chimneys built in a tight geometric arrangement.

The next member of the family to inherit Copped Hall was his son John Conyers (1748-1818), who extensively altered the house.

Decline

His son, Henry John Conyers (1782–1853), was said to be so obsessed with hunting that he neglected the house. He was survived by three daughters. The house was finally sold by the family in 1869. It was bought by George Wythes (1811-1883), who had made his fortune in civil engineering, building railways around the world.

Country Life magazine ran two articles on Copped Hall in 1910, illustrated with many photographs.

The main house was gutted in an accidental fire one Sunday morning in 1917 which was caused by an electrical fault.

The Wythes family, who were the then occupiers, moved into Wood House on the estate. Ernest Wythes died in 1949 and his wife died in 1951. Around 1950 the estate was sold, after which followed a period of total neglect, see Destruction of country houses in 20th-century Britain. The main 18th-century house was first stripped of its more desirable building materials then left to deteriorate. The orangery was blown up as an army training exercise in the 1960s. All the statues in the gardens were sold and removed to other large estate houses; some ended up in Anglesey Abbey in Cambridgeshire. Nineteen stone obelisks were purchased by the renowned diarist Sir Henry ‘Chips’ Channon and moved to Kelvedon Hall near, Brentwood, Essex. A gazebo from the garden was set up in the grounds of St Paul's Walden Bury.

In 1995, the derelict shell of the main house was used as a location for the music video for I Can't Be with You by The Cranberries.

Restoration

In 1995 the Copped Hall Trust acquired the freehold of the house, ancillary buildings and gardens, all of which they are slowly restoring. As of 2022 the house can be visited on certain days, with progress being made to replicate its Georgian decor. The surrounding parkland is now owned by the Conservators of Epping Forest, the City of London.

On 27 April 2004 Charles, Prince of Wales, accompanied by the Lord Lieutenant of Essex, Lord Petre, visited Copped Hall and inspected the restoration work. The Prince opened an exhibition of 18th-century botanical water-colours in the new temporary gallery. These water-colours were painted by Matilda Conyers, the daughter of John Conyers, who built Copped Hall.

The West Essex Archaeology Group (WEAG) hold annual excavations at a site in the Copped Hall grounds. These largely focus on the earthwork remains of the Tudor house, which predates the standing Georgian house. The digs comprise archaeology weekends for those with little experience, and a five-day field school for the more experienced.

The Woodhouse 
The Wood House is a 19th-century home on the Copped Hall estate.  Built in 1895 Ernest James Wythes.  He moved here from the main Copped Hall house when much of the Palladian mansion was destroyed by fire in 1917 and during its rebuilding though subsequently remaining at The Woodhouse. Singer Rod Stewart lived in the property for a number of year before selling it in March 2019 for just over £4 million.

Gallery

References

Further reading
Books
Brimble, James A. St. Thomas's Quarters. In: London's Epping Forest. London. Country Life, 1950. Chapter 10.
Cassidy, R. Copped Hall: a Short History. Waltham Abbey Historical Society, 2001.
Farmer, M.J. The history of the ancient Town and once famous Abbey of Waltham. London. 1735.
Newman, J. Copthall, Essex. In: H. Colvin and J. Harris (eds) The Country Seat. Studies in the history of the British country house presented to Sir John Summerson. London. Penguin, Press, 1970. 18–29.

Reports (by year)
West Essex Archaeological Group. An archaeological evaluation carried out at Copped Hall by West Essex Archaeological Group in 2002. West Essex Archaeological Group, 2003.
Holloway, C. Archaeological excavation at Copped Hall, Essex, in 2003. Copped Hall Trust Archaeological Project, 2005.
Holloway, C. Archaeological excavation at Copped Hall, Essex, 2004-5. Copped Hall Trust Archaeological Project, 2007.
West Essex Archaeological Group. Archaeology at Copped Hall 2002-2009. West Essex Archaeological Group. Accessed 5 April 2012
Madeley, Andrew & Holloway, Christina (West Essex Archaeological Group). The 2010 season at Copped Hall. West Essex Archaeological Group. Accessed 5 April 2012

Articles

External links

 Copped Hall Trust
Copped Hall entry from The DiCamillo Companion to British & Irish Country Houses
 Epping Forest District Council
 West Essex Archaeological Group
 
 
 Images of Copped Hall at the Country Life Picture Library
 Image of Copped Hall at the English Heritage Archive
 View of Copped Hall in Essex, from the Park, 1746 by George Lambert and Francis Hayman
 View of Copped Hall in Essex, from across the Lake, 1746 by George Lambert and Francis Hayman

Country houses in Essex
Ruins in Essex
Grade II listed buildings in Essex
Historic house museums in Essex
Grade II listed houses
Grade II* listed parks and gardens in Essex